Keith Ian Ellis (19 March 1946 – 12 December 1978), was an English bass player. He was born in Matlock, Derbyshire. He is known for his associations with The Koobas, The Misunderstood and Juicy Lucy. He was also a member of Van der Graaf Generator from 1968 to 1969. Ellis worked with Mike Patto and Ollie Halsall's band Boxer from 1975 until late 1976 when the original line-up split.

Ellis died in Darmstadt, Germany in 1978, whilst on tour with Iron Butterfly. No cause of death was determined, although the music journalist Ralph Heibutzki reported in a 2011 edition of Ugly Things that he was the victim of an accidental drug overdose. He left behind a widow, Deborah.

The song "Not For Keith" on the album pH7 by Peter Hammill, (1979) was a tribute to Ellis.

References

External links
 

1978 deaths
English bass guitarists
English male guitarists
Male bass guitarists
1946 births
Van der Graaf Generator members
Iron Butterfly members
People from Matlock, Derbyshire
20th-century English musicians
20th-century bass guitarists
20th-century British male musicians